There were two special elections in 1979 to the United States House of Representatives in the 96th United States Congress.  Both of them were won by Republicans, filling seats that were vacant since the January 3, 1979 beginning of the term.

List of elections 

Elections are listed by date and district.

|-
| 
| Leo Ryan
|  | Democratic
| 1972
|  | Incumbent member-elect had been re-elected November 7, 1978, but was then murdered November 18, 1978.New member elected April 3, 1979.Republican gain.
| nowrap | 

|-
| 
| William A. Steiger
|  | Republican
| 1966
|  | Incumbent member-elect had been re-elected November 7, 1978, but then died December 4, 1978.New member elected April 3, 1979.Republican hold.
| nowrap | 

|}

References 

 
1979